

Storms
Note:  indicates the name was retired after that usage in the respective basin

 Ubá (2021) — subtropical cyclone that dumped heavy rains in Southeastern Brazil, caused 15 deaths

 Uding
 1966 – strong tropical storm, hit the Philippines; also known as Nancy beyond the Philippine Area of Responsibility (PAR)
 1970 – strong tropical storm, made landfall in the Philippines Islands]]; also known as Louise beyond the (PAR)
 1974 – Category 2-equivalent typhoon, passed near the Philippines; also known as Della beyond the (PAR)
 1977 – powerful Category 4 typhoon, heavy rains caused flash flooding that left 55 people dead with widespread damage ; also known as Kim beyond the (PAR)
 1978 – formed west of the Philippines and struck Vietnam ; also known as Kit beyond the (PAR)
 1982 – Category 5 super typhoon, struck Guam as a tropical storm before nearing the Philippines and Japan; also known as Mac beyond the (PAR)
 1986 – killed two people while crossing the central Philippines ; also known as Ida beyond the (PAR)
 1994 – Category 3 typhoon, struck Taiwan and Fujian ; also known as Gladys beyond the (PAR)

 Uleki (1988) – long-lived Category 3 Hurricane in the Cenrtal Pacific and typhoon in the Western Pacific; caused high surf in Hawaii that killed two people.

 Ula (2015) – long-lived and powerful Category 4 cyclone, affected Tonga, Fiji, and Vanuatu.

 Ulika (2016) – Category 1 hurricane, churned in the open Central Pacific

 Ulpiang
 1996 – typhoon that passed south of Japan; also known as Dale beyond the (PAR)
 2000 – tropical depression that moved through the Philippines, killing 3 people

 Ului (2010) – Category 5 tropical cyclone that passed through the Solomon Islands and later struck eastern Australia.

 Ulysses
 2008 – Category 2-equivalent typhoon, sank a cargo passenger ship, killing at least 47 people; also known as Dolphin beyond the (PAR)
 2020 – destructive Category 4-equivalent typhoon, made landfall on Luzon and in Vietnam; also known as Vamco beyond the (PAR)

 Uma (1987) – killed 50 people when it struck the island of Vanuatu

 Una
 1965 – short-lived cyclone, passed south of Christmas Island
 1973 – a cyclone that struck Queensland

 Unala (2013) – storm that churned in the open Central Pacific

 Undang
 1964 –  Category 1-equivalent typhoon, interacted with the larger Typhoon Kathy; also known as Marie beyond the (PAR)
 1972 – Category 3-equivalent typhoon, killed 90 people in the Philippines and Vietnam; also known as Therese beyond the (PAR)
 1976 – depression that did not make landfall
 1980 – Category 4 typhoon, struck Taiwan and Fujian; also known as Percy beyond the (PAR)
 1984 – Category 4 typhoon, killed over 1,000 people when it moved through the Philippines and Vietnam; also known as Agnes beyond the (PAR)

 Unding
 1965 – Category 3-equivalent typhoon, brushed northern Luzon before striking southern China; also known as Rose beyond the (PAR)
 1977 – Category 4 typhoon, killed over 100 people in the Philippines; also known as Kim beyond the (PAR)
 2004 – Category 4 typhoon, affected the Philippines, Vietnam, Thailand, Myanmar and Malaysia; also known as Muifa beyond the (PAR)

 Unsang (1988) – Category 4 typhoon, made landfall along the central portion of Luzon and later on on Hainan Island; also known as Ruby beyond the (PAR)

 Unsing
1981 – crossed the Philippines and struck Vietnam; also known as Fabian beyond the (PAR)
 1985 – Category 3 typhoon, threatened Luzon but turned north and eastward out to sea; also known as Hope beyond the (PAR)
 1989 – Category 2 typhoon, hit the Philippines; also known as Hunt beyond the (PAR)
 1993 – weak tropical storm, hit Japan; also known as Zola beyond the (PAR)

 Upana (2000) – short-lived storm south of Hawaii, redeveloped in the western Pacific Ocean.

Upia (2002) – short-lived cyclone east of Papua New Guinea

 Urduja
 2009 – short-lived depression, developed east of Mindanao
 2013 – Category 5 typhoon, passed southeast of Okinawa and mainland Japan; also known as Francisco beyond the (PAR)
 2017 – traversed the Visayas region of the Philippines, causing more than ₱1 billion worth of damage; also known as Kai-tak beyond the (PAR)

 Uriah
 2007 – extratropical cyclone, exacerbated already severe flooding in Northern England
 2016 – Category 4 tropical cyclone moved across the open southern Indian Ocean.

 Uring
 1967 – Category 3-equivalent typhoon, struck Kyushu; also known as Dinah beyond the (PAR)
 1971 – Category 4 typhoon, struck Luzon and later Hong Kong and East china; also known as Rose beyond the (PAR)
 1979 – Category 3 typhoon, struck Palawan Island and Vietnam; also known as Sarah beyond the (PAR)
 1983 – Category 5 super typhoon, approached then curved northeast away from the Philippines; also known as Marge beyond the (PAR)
 1991 – tropical storm, struck the Philippines killing at least 5,081 people; also known as Thelma beyond the (PAR) 

 Urmil (2006) – short lived tropical cyclone, caused minor damage on Tonga

 Ursula
 1945 – Category 2-equivalent typhoon, made landfall on Taiwan and in China
 1971 – Category 2-equivalent tropical cyclone, did not affect land
 1998 – Category 1-equivalent tropical cyclone, passed through the Tuamotu Islands
 2003 – tropical depression, crossed Palawan
 2019 – Category 3-equivalent typhoon, struck the Philippines resulting in at least 50 deaths and $67.2 million (2019 USD) in damages; also known as Phanfone beyond the (PAR)
 
 Usagi
 2001 – weak but deadly storm, impacted Vietnam and Thailand
 2007 – Category 4 typhoon, struck Japan while weakening
 2013 – violent typhoon which affected Taiwan, the Philippines, China and Hong Kong; also known as Odette within the (PAR)
 2018 – Category 2 typhoon, affected the Philippines and southern Vietnam; also known as Samuel within the (PAR)

 Usha (1994) – moved through Vanuatu

 Usman (2018) – tropical depression, brought torrential rainfall and flooding to much of Visayas, killing 156 people and causing ₱5.41 billion damage

 Utor
 2001 – Category 1 typhoon, passed north of Luzon and struck Guangdong, killing 203 people; also known as known as Feria within the (PAR)
 2006 – Category 3 typhoon, swept through the central Philippines a few weeks after the deadly Typhoon Durian; also known as Seniang within the (PAR)
 2013 – Category 4 super typhoon, struck Luzon and southern China; also known as known as Labuyo within the (PAR)

See also
 Tropical cyclone naming
 List of historical tropical cyclone names

References

U